KT SkyLife (Korean: KT스카이라이프) is a satellite broadcasting provider in South Korea. It is a subsidiary of KT Corporation.

Brief history
 December 19, 2000 - The South Korean government decided to create an official satellite television provider (KT-lead KDB Consortium).
 March 30, 2001 - The company was founded.
 March 1, 2002 - Officially began to provide satellite broadcasting service.
 December 24, 2002 - Total number of subscribers exceeded 500,000.
 May 21, 2003 - Interactive television and Dolby 5.1 surround sound capabilities provided for the first time in South Korean television.
 September 29, 2003 - HDTV services and the SkyHD channel launched.
 October 28, 2003 - TV SMS services launched.
 November 1, 2003 - T-Commerce service launched.
 November 3, 2003 - Total number of subscribers exceeded 1 million.
 March 24, 2004 - Interactive election broadcasting service provided for the first time in Korea.
 April 11, 2005 - TV ordering service launched for the first time in Korea.
 May 3, 2005 - TV Banking service launched for the first time in Korea.
 June 14, 2006 - FIFA World Cup Germany 2006 rebroadcast in North Korea.
 November 20, 2006 - SkyPVR personal video recording service launched for the first time in Korea.
 December 31, 2006 - Number of subscribers amounted to 1.96 million, resulting in yearly profit of 3.6 billion won.
 February 24, 2007 - Number of subscribers reached 2 million.
 May 23, 2007 - SkyEnglishWorld English language channels only package released.
 April 1, 2008 - H.264 HD service launched
 January 1, 2009 - SkyEn, exclusive channel for men entertainment, was launched.
 March 5, 2009 - Discovery HD World launched.
 July 1, 2009 - Qook TV Skylife, joint service with Saterlite broadcast and IPTV's VOD, launched.
 January 1, 2010 - Sky3D, first 3D channel service in Korea, was launched.
 March 25, 2011 - Number of subscribers reached 3 million.
 March 29, 2011 - The company renamed from Korea Digital Satellite Broadcasting to KT Skylife because KT became the largest shareholder and took control of the company.
 May 30, 2011 - The KTSkylife New Channel This-colaunched 2011.
 July 31, 2011 - HDChannel 101Channels, New launched 2011 (Channel One|Entertainment, SBS-CNBC|News)
 December 31, 2011 - Entertainment Channel New 2011 Skyrainbow High-def launched
 January 1, 2012 - Channel IT, Data Channel For Korean, launched.
 July 1, 2012 - Ch.N, The M Relaunched

Channels
Total 200 channels as of April 2008 includes: (92 Video Channels/41 Audio Channels/20 Interactive Channels)

International Network (Asia Package)
Basic Pack
 KBS1
 KBS2
 MBC
 SBS
 EBS
 Arirang TV
 tvN Korea
 Mnet Korea
 SBS Plus
 SBS funE
 SBS Golf
 SBS Sports
 SBS Biz
 SBS MTV
 MBC Every 1
 MBC M
 MBC ON
 MBC Sports
 MBC Net
 MBC Dramanet
 Animal Planet
 Animax Korea
 AXN Korea
 NOW Korea
 Celestial Movies
 Super Action
 Orion Cinema Network
 Cartoon Network
 Channel NewsAsia
 Nat Geo Wild
 Discovery Channel
 History Korea
 Lifetime Korea
 서울신문 STV
 JTBC
 JTBC 2
 JTBC 4
 JTBC Golf & Sports
 JTBC Golf
 YTN
 MBN
 TV Chosun (TV조선)
 Channel A Korea
 Zee Bollywood
 TRT Turk
 CCTV 4 Asia
 Smithsonian Channel
 WION TV	
 SEA Today	
 CGTN
 NHK World Premium
 FOX News
 Aniplus
 Tooniverse
 more all channels

Source: SkyLife Official Homepage

Investments
Based on the data of March 31, 2011.
 KT 52.93%
 KT Network 0.12%
 KBS 7.17%
 MBC 4.30%
 Others 35.47%

References

External links
 Official Homepage (Korean)
 Official Homepage (English)

KT Group
Companies based in Seoul
Mass media companies of South Korea
Direct broadcast satellite services
Television channels and stations established in 2001
South Korean companies established in 2001